Aspidapion is a genus of beetles belonging to the family Apionidae. The species of this genus are found in Europe and Africa.

Species
The following species are recognised in the genus Aspidapion:
 Aspidapion acerifoliae Suppantschitsch, 1996 
 Aspidapion aeneum (Fabricius, 1775) 
 Aspidapion caprai Giusto, 1993
 Aspidapion roudieri Richard, 1957 
 Aspidapion soror (Rey, 1895) 
 Aspidapion validum (Germar, 1817)

References

Brentidae